The Long Beach Unified School District   is a school district headquartered in Long Beach, California, United States.
Established in 1885, Long Beach Unified School District now
educates 81,000 students in 84 public schools in the cities of
Long Beach, Lakewood, Signal Hill, and Avalon on Catalina
Island. The school district is the third largest in California and
serves one of the most diverse large cities in the United States.
The student population is 53.1 percent Hispanic, 15.6 percent
African American, 15.2 percent white, 11.2 percent Asian,
3 percent multi-race, 1.7 percent Pacific Islander and 0.2
percent Native American. More than two-thirds of the student
population come from lower-income households and qualify
for free and reduced price meals. The school district employs
more than 8,000 people, making it the largest employer in
Long Beach.

History
As of 1993 several parents in the LBUSD boundaries enrolled their children in the Los Alamitos Unified School District day care program so that they could then use LBUSD district transfer rules, stating that parents may enroll their children at a school closest to their daycare provider even if the school is in another school district, to obtain an inter-district transfer from the Los Alamitos district and send their children to Los Alamitos schools. As a result, LBUSD was losing money, because state education funds were paid based on attendance. Horn said "It was never anyone's intention to make the (child-care) program a drawing card from other school districts. It did turn out that way." Gordon Dillow of the Los Angeles Times said "Although school officials say they do not track the racial make-up of their inter-district transfer students, the perception has been that many, perhaps most, of the Long Beach-to-Los Alamitos transfer students are Anglo." Whites were a minority in LBUSD, with 26% of the student body, while they were a majority at Los Alamitos USD, with 75% of the student body. In the 1992-1993 school year, 400 students who lived in LBUSD attended Los Alamitos schools because a parent was working at Los Alamitos schools or because of the after school program. Dillow said that while the loss of that number of students from LBUSD, with 76,000 students, "may not seem significant, but it does cause the school district to lose about $4,000 per year for each student in state education funding." LBUSD began investigating the idea of establishing before and after school programs at its schools so that parents could no longer use the loophole. LBUSD established a new after school program, "Kid's Club." 140 were enrolled in August 1993 and the district expected a total of 300 to be enrolled by the beginning of the school year.

On January 18, 1994, the LBUSD Board of Education voted to require school uniforms in all elementary and middle schools, with the wearing of school uniforms to start in September 1994. The district was the first large urban school district in the United States to require school uniforms.  On August 23, 1994, SB 1269 the School Uniform Law was approved by the Governor of California to support schools that adopt a school-wide uniform policy, which also allowed parents to opt out of the policy. At LBUSD, roughly 2% of the students opt out of the uniform policy.

Since starting the uniform policy, LBUSD claimed assaults dropped by two-thirds, suspensions dropped by almost a third, vandalism dropped, attendance improved, and test scores increased. President Bill Clinton mentioned LBUSD's uniform policy in his 1996 State of the Union address. Numerous other large urban districts have now adopted school uniform policies.

Some researchers, including David Brunsma of the Sociology Department of University of Missouri, have said that the benefits ascribed to the implementation of the LBUSD uniform policy were logically attributable to other factors; such as increased school security, collateral attendance enforcement efforts, and in-class programs designed to bolster sagging test scores.

LBUSD now has two high schools, Woodrow Wilson Classical High School, and Millikan High School, that require school uniforms as well.

In 1999, Jefferson Leadership Academies became the first public middle school in the United States to convert entirely to single gender classes. Only a few dozen more schools have followed this trend, mostly because of Title IX of the 1972 Education Act, which prohibits sex discrimination in federally funded programs. The school has plans to discontinue the program after scheduling conflicts and disappointing test scores.

In 2001, there was a movement to form a Lakewood Unified School District. Because students in the city of Lakewood are currently divided between four different school districts (ABC Unified School District, Bellflower Unified School District, Paramount Unified School District and LBUSD), a petition was started. After gathering the required number of petition signatures and an LA County review, the issue went before the California State Board of Education. The board rejected the petition on February 8, 2001 because the board said the proposed district failed to meet four of the state's nine criteria for new district formation. With that setback, the most current plans are to try to merge those areas of Lakewood served by Paramount into either the Bellflower or Long Beach Unified School Districts.

District awards
LBUSD was the winner of the third-annual $1 million Broad Prize for Urban Education in 2017. The Broad Prize is the largest education prize in the country awarded to urban school districts. In 2004, LBUSD received a second grant from the Broad Foundation for $1.14 million to continue their efforts to improve the organization of the district's schools using Baldrige strategies. In 2004, the Broad Foundation also awarded 55 Long Beach Unified School District seniors $500,000 in scholarships as Broad Prize Scholars. LBUSD has gone on to receive nominations for the award three more times and once prior to winning (2002, 2006, 2007, 2008).

Unusual schools
Two Harbors Elementary School, at Two Harbors on Catalina Island, is a one-room school. Enrollment is 12 students. In 2014, the Two Harbors one-room schoolhouse closed due to low enrollment, and students now go to school on the other side of the island in Avalon, which is a 45-minute to 1-hour drive. Previously the district had planned to close the school in fall 2005, but Two Harbors residents and visitors raised enough money to keep the school open.

List of schools

Elementary schools

Addams Elementary School
Alvarado Elementary School
Barton Elementary School
Birney Elementary School
Bixby Elementary School
Bryant Elementary School
Burbank Elementary School
Burcham Elementary School
Carver Elementary School
Chavez Elementary School
Cleveland Elementary School
Dooley Elementary School
Edison Elementary School
Emerson Parkside Academy
Fremont Elementary School
Gant Elementary School
Garfield Elementary School
Gompers Elementary School
Grant Elementary School
Harte Elementary School
Henry Dual Immersion School
Herrera Elementary School
Holmes Elementary School
Kettering Elementary School
King Elementary School
Lafayette Elementary School
Lincoln Elementary School
Longfellow Elementary School
Los Cerritos Elementary School
Lowell Elementary School
MacArthur Elementary School
Madison Elementary School
Mann Elementary School
McKinley Elementary School
Naples Bayside Academy
Oropeza Elementary School
Prisk Elementary School
Riley Elementary School
Roosevelt Elementary School
Signal Hill Elementary School
Smith Elementary School
Stevenson Elementary School
Twain Elementary School
Webster Elementary School
Whittier Elementary School
Willard Elementary School

K-8 schools

Cubberley School
Hudson School
Muir Academy
Newcomb Academy
Powell Academy
Robinson Academy
Tincher Preparatory School

K-12 schools
Avalon School in Avalon on Catalina Island (Divided into elementary, junior high, and high schools, but with a single principal)

Middle schools

Bancroft Middle School
Franklin Classical Middle School
Hamilton Middle School
Hoover Middle School
Hughes Middle School
Jefferson Leadership Academies
Keller Dual Immersion Middle School
Lindbergh STEM Academy
Lindsey Academy
Marshall Academy of the Arts
Nelson Academy
Rogers Middle School
Stanford Middle School
Stephens Middle School
Washington Middle School

High schools

Comprehensive High Schools

Cabrillo High School
Jordan High School

Lakewood High School 
Long Beach Polytechnic High School 
Millikan High School
Wilson High School

Other high schools
 Beach High School/Long Beach School for Adults
Browning High School
 California Academy of Mathematics and Science (CAMS) [on the CSU Dominguez Hills campus]
 Renaissance High School for the Arts
 Educational Partnership High School (EPHS)
 Reid Continuation High School
 McBride High School
 Sato Academy of Mathematics and Science

Charter schools
 Intellectual Virtues Academy
 Clear Passage Educational Center

Other schools
Buffum Total Learning Center
Tucker Transitional Center
Long Beach School for Adults

Former schools
Buffum Elementary School
(Converted to Buffum Total Learning Center)
Constellation Community Charter Middle School
(Closed due to low enrollment)
Burroughs Elementary School
(Now used as a District-wide Teacher Resources Center and Head Start Program Offices)
Butler Middle School
(Closed and Students Transferred to Nelson Academy)
Monroe K-8 School
(Closed during the 2010 Recession)
New City School/Colegio New City
(Closed due to low test scores)
DeMille Middle School
(Closed and Demolished in 2011, campus now houses McBride High School)
Hill Middle School
(Closed in 2016, Campus now houses Sato Academy of Mathematics and Science) 
Keller Elementary School
(Converted to Keller Dual Immersion Middle School)
The camp allowed urban students to experience a week of outdoor education. The first class of sixth graders was on April 19, 1948. More recently, fifth graders traditionally spent a week at Camp Hi-Hill. Unfortunately, due to cost and increasing fire risk, the school district closed the camp in 2008 and it remains vacant as of 2016.

See also

List of school districts in Los Angeles County, California

References

External links

 
Education in Long Beach, California
School districts in Los Angeles County, California
Lakewood, California
Signal Hill, California
1885 establishments in California
School districts established in 1885